Bakaata (also spelled Boqaâta or Baq'ata) is a town located in the Chouf District of the Mount Lebanon Governorate, about  southeast of Beirut. Bordering towns include Symkanieh, Ain wa Zein, and Jdeidet El Shouf. Its inhabitants are predominantly Druze.

References

Populated places in Chouf District
Druze communities in Lebanon